Belle Story (born Grace Leard, c. 1887) was an American vaudeville performer and singer, noted for her coloratura soprano style.  She appeared in a number of productions at the New York Hippodrome.

In his autobiography, composer Richard Rodgers recalled that Story "had been a leading singer at the New York Hippodrome.  She had a lovely coloratura voice and made a big hit wherever we played, particularly with her singing of 'The Marriage of the Lily and the Rose.' "

Selected performances
 Chin Chin 
 Hip Hip Hooray (1916)
 Everything (1918)
 Happy Days (1919)
 Good Times (1920)

References

External links

 
 
 1917 photo, University of Washington Libraries, Special Collection Division

1880s births
American stage actresses
Musicians from Pennsylvania
Vaudeville performers
20th-century American actresses
Year of death missing